Ten ships of the Royal Navy have borne the name HMS Basilisk, after the Basilisk, a mythical lizard:

  was a 4-gun bomb vessel launched in 1695 and broken up in 1729.
  was a 4-gun bomb vessel launched in 1740 and sold in 1750.
  was an 8-gun bomb vessel launched in 1759 and captured in 1762 by the French privateer .
 HMS Basilisk was a fireship, previously the 14-gun sloop .  She was renamed HMS Basilisk in 1779 and was sold in 1783.
  was a 12-gun  launched in 1801 and sold in 1815.
  was a 6-gun cutter launched in 1822 and sold in 1846.
  was a wood paddle sloop launched in 1848 and broken up in 1882.
  was a  steel screw sloop launched in 1889.  She became a coal hulk and was renamed C 7, finally being sold into civilian service in 1905.
  was a  launched in 1910 and sold in 1921.
  was a  launched in 1930 and sunk in 1940.

Royal Navy ship names